Boreosomus (meaning: "boreal body") is an extinct genus of Triassic ray-finned fish. It was first described from the Arctic island of Spitsbergen (Svalbard, Norway), but was later also discovered in other parts of the world. Boreosomus belongs to the family Ptycholepidae (= Boreosomidae/Chungkingichthyidae). Other genera of this family are Acrorhabdus (Spitsbergen), Ardoreosomus (Nevada, United States), Chungkingichthys (China), Ptycholepis (global) and Yuchoulepis (China).

Description

The type species is Boreosomus arcticus (= Acrolepis arctica Woodward, 1912). A characteristic feature of this family is the dorsal fin, which inserts at the level of the pelvic fins in the middle portion of the body. Most contemporary ray-fins have their dorsal fin in a more posterior position, often opposite to the anal fin. Also typical for ptycholepids are the somewhat rectangular, horizontally arranged suborbital bones.

Fossil record
Boreosomus had a worldwide distribution during the Early Triassic. Fossils of Boreosomus were found, apart from Spitsbergen, in Greenland, Madagascar, China, Spain, Svalbard and Jan Mayen, United States and Canada.

Species
Species within this genus include:
 †Boreosomus arcticus (Woodward, 1912) [Acrolepis arctica Woodward 1912] (type species)
 †Boreosomus gillioti (Priem, 1924) [Diaphorognathus gillioti (Priem 1924); Gyrolepis gillioti Priem 1924]
 †Boreosomus merlei Beltan, 1957
 †Boreosomus piveteaui Stensiö, 1921
 †Boreosomus reuterskioeldi Stensiö, 1921
 †Boreosomus scaber Stensiö, 1921

See also

 Prehistoric fish
 List of prehistoric bony fish

References 

Prehistoric ray-finned fish genera
Palaeonisciformes